The 1972 UCLA Bruins football team represented University of California, Los Angeles (UCLA) in the 1972 NCAA University Division football season.  the Pacific-8 Conference, the Bruins were led by second-year head coach Pepper Rodgers and played their home games at the 

The new quarterback this season was Mark Harmon, a junior college transfer and son of Heisman Trophy winner Tom Harmon. In his first game for the Bruins, Harmon led the wishbone offense and gained a late night upset of top-ranked Nebraska at the Coliseum. An  underdog, UCLA was never behind; Nebraska had five turnovers but fought back to tie the score before halftime at ten and again early in the fourth quarter at seventeen.

Two weeks later, the Bruins lost at home to Michigan, but then won six straight and improved to  overall. An upset loss to Washington at Husky Stadium in Seattle and an expected one to top-ranked rival USC in the Coliseum ended UCLA's season  The Pac-8 runner-up, they were ranked fifteenth in the final AP poll; the conference did not allow a second bowl team until

Schedule

 Prior to the 1975 season, the Pac-8 and Big Ten conferences allowed only one postseason participant each, for the Rose Bowl.

Roster

Awards and honors
All-Conference First Team: Bruce Barnes (P), Allan Ellis (DB), Kermit Johnson (RB), Steve Klosterman (OG), James McAlister (RB), Fred McNeill (DE), Bruce Walton (OT)

References

External links
 Sports Reference - 1972 UCLA football season

UCLA
UCLA Bruins football seasons
UCLA Bruins football
UCLA Bruins football